The Emergency Medical Retrieval Service (EMRS) provides aeromedical critical care to people in Scotland. It provides patients in remote and rural areas with rapid access to the skills of a consultant in emergency medicine, intensive care medicine, or anaesthesia, and facilitates transfers to larger, better equipped urban hospitals. The EMRS functions supplementary to the regular Scottish Ambulance Service Air Ambulance service. Unlike air ambulance services in other parts of the UK, both services are funded by the Scottish Government.  The service responds to seriously ill and injured patients, often in remote locations, who require early critical care interventions and quick transfer to a better equipped, urban hospital.

  

The EMRS has occasionally featured on the Channel 5 documentary series Highland Emergency, which charts the work of rescue services in the Scottish Highlands.

The team is available 24 hours a day for inter-hospital transfers, although overnight this is on an on-call basis, with services provided in partnership with the Scottish Ambulance Service utilising both helicopters and fixed-wing aircraft. The EMRS now operates as part of ScotSTAR, the Scottish national retrieval service, sharing a bespoke base at Glasgow Airport.

History
2004: The EMRS was formed in 2004 when NHS Argyll and Clyde approved a 12-month trial which involved 11 consultants in emergency or intensive care medicine. The EMRS was initially based at Glasgow City Heliport and operated only in the Argyll and Clyde area. During the first 12 months the EMRS attended 3 patients a month.

2007: In 2007, the service was extended to cover three rural general hospitals and 13 community hospitals as part of an 18-month trial funded with £1.59million. The success of the service saw its operating zone expanded throughout the west coast of Scotland and the EMRS now operates from Stranraer in the south to Stornoway in the north. An independent service evaluation demonstrated value for money and lifesaving benefits of critical care retrieval.2010: In March 2010, the Scottish Government acknowledged that due to its continuing success, the service would be further enhanced by the addition of a second team, operational from October 2010. The second team increased the number of participating consultants and doctors from eight to fifteen. 
In 2010, around 90% of EMRS activity involved secondary retrieval. Annual running costs were now in the region of £2M.  
In 2011, annual activity was estimated to be 324 transfers each year with around 60% of these by rotary wing and 35% by fixed-wing aircraft.

2014: In June 2014, EMRS teams began to routinely carry a stock of O negative blood to allow transfusion earlier when responding to emergencies. During the period of the 2014 Commonwealth Games a third team of medics was available. , the staff of the service had expanded to include 27 part-time consultants and had completed more than 3,000 retrievals.

2015: In September 2015, the EMRS announced their move to a new purpose-built base, located at Glasgow Airport.

Resources 
As the retrieval service doesn't have any vehicles to transport patients.  They are supported by land ambulances, aircraft from the Scottish Ambulance Service's Air Ambulance Division, the Scottish Charity Air Ambulance and the helicopters of the UK Coastguard. 

EMRS North team (based 100 miles South of the northern tip of mainland Scotland) is on base between 0800 and 1800, and EMRS West (in Glasgow) between 0700 and 2300 for immediate deployment, outside these hours they’re on-call and will take longer to deploy.

Equipment
Collaboration with the Scottish National Blood Transfusion Service (SNBTS) allows the EMRS to have O-negative blood immediately available to take on all missions.

The EMRS have developed a bespoke app to make their standard operating procedures available to clinicians.

Clinical Interventions 
Prehospital workload

The team is dispatched to between 1 and 2 prehospital calls a day. Not all of these result in the team reaching a patient. The team provide critical care interventions to only 17% of their prehospital patients.

The EMRS team perform prehospital anaesthesia when needed, with a complication rate of 4% . and a first pass success rate of 80%.

The two EMRS Teams perform 18 prehospital anaesthetics between them per year.

Secondary or tertiary retrieval

Their average (median) total on-scene time with a patient requiring inter-hospital transport before transporting is one hour.

Historic Awards
In March 2010, EMRS won the Secondary Care Team of the Year category in the BMJ awards for its work in “transforming the care and transfer of seriously ill and injured patients in remote and rural Scotland”. This award recognised hospital teams that demonstrate improved outcomes of medical & surgical conditions.

In 2012, the app developed by the EMRS won the EHI award for best use of mobile technology in healthcare and the NHS Scotland eHealth award for Best NHS Scotland use of Mobile technology.

Controversy 

	
2022: It came to light that EMRS have been deploying as a “Red Team” for the Scottish Ambulance Service without a Consultant on board.

See also 
 Air ambulances in the United Kingdom
 BASICS Scotland
 Emergency medical services in the United Kingdom
 Highland PICT Team

References

External links 
 

NHS Scotland
Scottish Government
2004 establishments in Scotland